Rooh Afza (Soul Refresher) is a concentrated squash. It was formulated in 1906 in Ghaziabad, British India by Hakeem Muhammad Kabeeruddin and introduced by Hakim Hafiz Abdul Majeed, and launched from Old Delhi, India. Currently, Rooh Afza is manufactured by the companies founded by him and his sons, Hamdard Laboratories, India, Hamdard Laboratories (Waqf) Pakistan and Hamdard Laboratories (Waqf) Bangladesh. Since 1948, the company has been manufacturing the product in India, Pakistan and Bangladesh.

Other companies formulate the same un-patented recipe in these countries as well. The specific Unani recipe of Rooh Afza combines several ingredients popularly believed to be cooling agents, such as rose, which is used as a remedy for loo (the hot summer winds of Northern India and Pakistan and Bangladesh). The drink is commonly associated with the month of Ramadan, in which it is usually consumed during iftar. It is sold commercially as a syrup to flavour sherbets, cold milk drinks, ices, and cold desserts such as the popular falooda. The name Rooh Afza is sometimes translated as "refresher of the soul". It is said that this name was made up by the original formulator of the drink, with possible cultural influences.

History

Rooh Afza was founded by Hamdard's founder Hakim Hafiz Abdul Majeed. In 1906, he wanted to create a herbal mix that would help Delhi's people stay cool in the summer. He selected herbs and syrups from traditional Unani medicine and created a drink that would help counter heat strokes and prevent water loss in people. An artist, Mirza Noor Ahmad, designed the labels of Rooh Afza in many colours in 1910. Progress in development and refining the original recipe continued all along until the final drink emerged.

After Majeed's death 15 years later, his wife Rabea Begum established a charitable trust in the name of herself and their two sons.

Following the partition of India in 1947, while the elder son, Hakim Abdul Hameed, stayed back in India – the younger son, Hakim Mohammad Said, migrated to Pakistan on 9 January 1948 and started a separate Hamdard Company from two rooms in the old Arambagh area of Karachi. Hamdard Pakistan finally became profitable in 1953. Hakim Mohammad Said had opened a branch of Hamdard in the former East Pakistan. According to Hakim Mohammad Said's daughter, Sadia Rashid, chairperson of Hamdard Pakistan in 2019, her father gifted the business to the people of Bangladesh after their independence in 1971.

In 2010, chef Nita Mehta and Indian film actress Juhi Chawla were hired for promotional activities by Hamdard Laboratories to create new mocktail and dessert recipes for Rooh Afza, their all-season summer drink, which was used in a new marketing campaign.

Ingredients
Its original formulation included:

Herbs: 
 Deepak ("khurfa seeds", Portulaca oleracea)
 Chicory
 Wine-grape raisins (Vitis vinifera)
 European white lily (Nymphaea alba)
 Blue star water lily (Nymphaea nouchali)
 Lotus (nelumbo)
 Borage
 coriander 
 Rosemary

Fruits: 
 Orange
 Citron 
 Pineapple
 Apple
 Berries
 Strawberry
 Raspberry 
 Loganberry
 Blackberry
 Cherry
 Concord grapes
 Blackcurrant 
 Watermelon

Vegetables: 
 Spinach
 Carrot
 Mint
 Sponge gourd (Luffa aegyptiaca)

Flowers: 
 Rose 
 Kewra (Pandanus fascicularis)
 Lemon
 Orange

Roots:
 Vetiver (Chrysopogon zizanioides)

Preparation
Rooh Afza syrup is generally served mixed with cold milk and ice; the closest Western equivalent is strawberry milk. Rooh Afza is often prepared as part of Iftar (the evening meal for breaking the fast or roza), during Ramadan (the holy month of fasting for Muslims). The concentrate can also be mixed with water, which is a common preparation in the hot Pakistani summer. When mixed with water, the final drink is a type of sharbat. Rooh Afza syrup is often mixed with Kulfi ice cream and vermicelli to make a similar version of the popular Iranian dessert Faloodeh.

Lawsuit and fine in Bangladesh
On the complaint of false information, misleading advertisements and publication of false information on the web site, Safe Food Inspector Kamrul Hassan filed a case against Hamdard Laboratories Bangladesh on May 30, 2018. In the case, he mentions that the information published in the advertisement with 'Rooh Afza made with 35 fruit juice' is not correct. On June 12 of the same year, Pure food court judge AFM Maruf Chowdhury fined the company four lakhs taka for publishing misleading advertisements. If unable to pay the fine, then the Hamdard chairman and managing director would be punished for three months' imprisonment.

Variants 
Hamdard Laboratories India has launched two ready to drink variants in India namely RoohAfza Fusion and RoohAfza Milkshake.

References

External links

 Official Website of Hamdard Laboratories (WAQF), Bangladesh (Archive)
 Official Website of Hamdard Laboratories, India
 Official Website of Hamdard Laboratories (Waqf) Pakistan

Non-alcoholic drinks
Indian drink brands
Pakistani drinks
Bangladeshi drinks
Pakistani drink brands
Products introduced in 1906
Iftar foods